Crandall is an unincorporated community in Day County, in the U.S. state of South Dakota.

History
A post office called Crandall was established in 1908, and remained in operation until 1973. The community was named for Walter S. Crandell, the relative of a railroad official (a recording error accounts for the error in spelling, which was never corrected).

References

Unincorporated communities in Day County, South Dakota
Unincorporated communities in South Dakota